Yangyu Xiang Station is a station of Line 1, Suzhou Rail Transit. The station is located in Gusu District of Suzhou. It has been in use since April 28, 2012, the same time of the operation of Line 1.

Station

Accessible information
 Yangyu Xiang Station is a fully accessible station, this station equipped with wheelchair accessible elevators, blind paths with bumps, and wheelchair ramps. These facilities can help people with disabilities, seniors, youths, and pregnancies travel through Suzhou Rail Transit system.

Station configurations
L1 (First Floor/Street Level): Entrances/Exits (stairs and escalators); and elevators with wheelchair accessible ramps.

B1 (Mezzanine/Station Hall Level): Station Control Room; Customer Service; Automatic Ticket Vending Machines; Automatic Fee Collection Systems with turnstiles; stairs and escalators; and elevators with wheelchair accessible ramps.

B2 (Platform Level): Platform; toilet; stairs and escalators; elevators with wheelchair accessible ramps.

Station layout

First & last trains

Exits information
Exit 1: On the South side of Ganjiang Lu, West of Yangyu Xiang

Exit 2: On the North side of Ganjiang Lu, West of Yangyu Xiang

Exit 3: On the North side of Ganjiang Lu, West of Yangyu Xiang

Local attractions
TongHe XinCun Garden
TianHe Garden
LeJia Building
Suzhou Human Resource Market
ChuangYuan Commerce Center
Suzhou Commerce Building
Bank of China Suzhou Branch Headquarter

Bus connections
Bus Stop: XueShi Jie - Connection Bus Routes: 2, 9, 60, 307, 800, 900, 923

Bus Stop: YangYu Xiang - Connection Bus Routes: 2, 9, 60, 146, 305, 307, 800, 900, 923

Bus Stop: GanJiang Lu- Connection Bus Routes: 305, 602

References

Railway stations in Jiangsu
Suzhou Rail Transit stations
Railway stations in China opened in 2012